Margery Wolf (born Jones, September 9, 1933 – April 14, 2017) was an American anthropologist, writer, scholar, and feminist activist. She published numerous ethnographic works that brought her attention in China and the U.S. and played a formative role in anthropology.

Biography 
Margery Wolf was born in Santa Rosa, California, on September 9, 1933. As a child, she lived on Humboldt Street with her parents (Alvie Jones and Alvia Makee), before moving to a five-acre farm in California, and also in Taiwan, Ithaca, North Carolina and Iowa. Margery Wolf graduated from Santa Rosa High School at age 16 and graduated from Santa Rosa Junior College in 1952. She was enrolled in San Francisco State University from 1952 to 1953, where she married Arthur Wolf, with whom she moved to Ithaca, New York. Settling in New York State, she completed her art degree at Cornell University. In 1955, Margery Wolf began working as a research assistant to social psychologist William Lambert, coding ethnographic material as part of the cross-cultural Six Cultures project, which conducted field-based research on the upbringing and development of children on a variety of issues. She divorced her first marriage in 1984, and later remarried Mac Marshall, another Anthropologist.

Education 
Margery Wolf graduated from Santa Rosa High School at age 16. She received an associate degree from Santa Rosa Junior College in 1952, yet never obtained a graduate degree. She was enrolled in San Francisco State for two years (1952-1953).

Career 
She started her career in 1955 when she became a research assistant to William Lambert, a social psychologist. She also worked under other anthropologists who mentored her and recognized her talent. Later in her career, she became the professor of the Department of Anthropology at the University of Iowa. She was also the secretary of the American Anthropological Association. Throughout her career, she wrote books about her experiences. Her first book, The House of Lim: A Study of a Chinese Farm Family, published in 1968, was about her time in Taiwan. This became her best known book. Later in her life she was hired by the University of Iowa as a Full Professor of Anthropology and Chair of the Women's Studies Program. She retired from the University of Iowa in 2001.

Women and the family in rural Taiwan was published in 1972 and examined the ways in which rural Taiwanese women manipulate men and other women in pursuit of their personal goals. Her 1986 book The Revolution Postponed: Women in Contemporary China explored the extent to which revolutionary communist China fulfilled the end of women's secondary role in legal, political, social and economic life. A Tale Thrice Told: Feminism, Postmodernism and Ethnographic Responsibility, which dates from 1992, was Wolf's response to the methodological issues raised by feminist and postmodernist critics of traditional ethnography.

Published works 

 The House of Lim: A Study of a Chinese Farm Family (1968)
 Women and the Family in Rural Taiwan (1972)
 Women in Chinese Society (1975)
 Revolution Postponed: Women in Contemporary China (1985)
 A Thrice-Told Tale: Feminism, Postmodernism, and Ethnographic Responsibility (1992)
 The Orchards (2008)
 What the Water Buffalo Wrought (2013)
 Trouble at the U (2018)
 Coyote's Land: A Novel Ethnography (2018)

Death 
Wolf died of acute respiratory failure at Kaiser Hospital on April 14, 2017. She was described as “a force of nature, larger than life, strong and whole” by peers as well as an “extraordinary scholar, activist, thinker, writer, and mentor”.

References 

1933 births
2017 deaths
American anthropologists
American feminist writers
Cornell University alumni
People from Santa Rosa, California